Captain John Peter Ralph Marriott CMG (28 November 1879 – 21 December 1938) was a British Royal Navy officer.

Marriott was the son of Major Charles Frederick Marriott of the British Army and his wife Isabella (née Jerningham). He married Margaret Murray, daughter of the oceanographer Sir John Murray, and they had two sons, John and Peter. In 1894, he joined the Royal Navy as a Naval Cadet, and he was promoted to lieutenant on 1 April 1902. As a junior officer he was posted to the sloop HMS Beagle on 1 July 1902, serving on her in the South Atlantic. Later, he served in the light cruiser HMS Hyacinth, flagship of the East Indies and Egyptian Squadron, the armoured cruiser HMS Drake, flagship of the 5th Cruiser Squadron, and the cadet training cruiser HMS Cornwall. For two years he served on the staff of the Royal Naval College, Osborne.

In June 1914, he was promoted Commander and became executive officer of the cruiser HMS Charybdis. In Gallipoli, he was attached to the staff of the Australian and New Zealand Army Corps, and was mentioned in dispatches. He then became Naval Assistant to the First Sea Lord, Rosslyn Wemyss (whose flagship the Charybdis had been), at the Admiralty in London, with the rank of Acting Captain.

Representing Britain at the signing of the Armistice in a railway carriage in Compiègne Forest on 11 November 1918, he was witness to the end of World War I and a marked victory for the Allies. He was confirmed in the rank of Captain in December 1918. He later attended the Paris Peace Conference, 1919. In 1920 he was appointed Naval Attaché in Tokyo. He voluntarily retired in 1922 following the "Geddes Axe", hoping that by so doing he would save from compulsory retirement an officer who was less able to afford it. He was recalled for special service in Egypt during the period of tension over Abyssinia.

For his war service, he was appointed Companion of the Order of St Michael and St George (CMG) in the 1920 New Year Honours and also Chevalier of the Légion d'honneur, Commander of the Order of the Crown of Italy, Officer of the Order of the Nile and the Order of the Rising Sun.

Footnotes

References
Obituary, The Times (23 January 1938)
"Ferdinand Foch, commander-in-chief" Britannica.com

1879 births
1938 deaths
Royal Navy officers of World War I
Companions of the Order of St Michael and St George
Chevaliers of the Légion d'honneur